Surpala is a village situated in Khargone District of Madhya Pradesh, India. Surpala belongs to Barwaha Tehsil and Khargone District. It is located in the area known as West Nimar.

Economy 
Economically this village is dependent on agriculture. It is known for production of cotton, papaya, wheat, soybean and chili. The main language spoken in the area is Nimari (a regional language, generally spoken in rural parts of Khargone District) and official work is done in Hindi.

References 

Villages in Khargone district